Chilisso is an Indo-Aryan language spoken by a thousand people in eastern Kohistan, Pakistan.

References

Dardic languages